The Franco-Trarzan War of 1825 was a conflict between the forces of the new emir of Trarza, Muhammad al Habib, and France, ruled at the time by Charles X and the ultra comte de Villèle. In 1825, Muhammad attempted to establish control over the French-protected Waalo Kingdom, then located south of the Senegal River, by marrying the heiress to the kingdom. The French responded by sending a large expeditionary force that crushed Muhammad's army. The war incited the French to expand to the north of the Senegal River.

See also 
France in the long nineteenth century
French colonial empire
List of French possessions and colonies

References

Leland C. Barrows. "Faidherbe and Senegal: A Critical Discussion" in African Studies Review, Vol. 19, No. 1 (April 1976), pp. 95–117.
Boubacar Barry. Senegambia and the Atlantic Slave Trade. Cambridge University Press (1998). 
Muhammed Al Muhtar W. As-sa'd, "Émirats et espace émiral maure: le cas du Trârza aux XVIIIe-XIXe siècles", Mauritanie, entre arabité et africanité, Revue des mondes musulmans et de la Méditerranée, no. 54, (July 1990), p. 53–82.  
Mohamed Mokhtar Ould Saad. L'Emirat du Trarza et ses relations avec les royaumes soudanais de la vallée du fleuve Sénégal au cours des XVIIIème et XIXème siècles. Département d’histoire/FLSH, Université de Nouakchott. 
James L. A. Webb Jr. "The Trade in Gum Arabic: Prelude to French Conquest in Senegal". The Journal of African History, Vol. 26, No. 2/3 (1985), pp. 149–168.

Wars involving France
Wars involving Mauritania
Wars involving Senegal
Conflicts in 1825
French West Africa
1825 in France
19th century in Africa
1825 in Africa
African resistance to colonialism